Yandex.Drive is a Russian carsharing service owned by Yandex. The service in Moscow, Moscow Oblast, Saint-Petersburg, 
Kazan and Sochi.The cothlaunched in February 2018. The vehicle park consists of Kia Rio, 
Kia Rio X-Line, Renault Kaptur, Skoda Octavia, Skoda Rapid, Nissan Leaf, Nissan Qashqai, Audi A3, Audi Q3, Porsche Macan, Porsche 911 Carrera, Ford Mustang of 1965 and 1969, BMW 5 Series, 
Mercedes-Benz E-Class, 
Volkswagen Polo, Genesis G70, Citroen Jumpy and Volkswagen Transporter  of January 2020 its vehicle fleet is over 21000 cars. According to the Financial Times, Yandex.Drive is the largest carsharing company in the world.

History 

Initially, Yandex did not plan to launch its own carsharing, but wanted to make an aggregator ( the Yandex project.Carsharing", it was closed in November 2017). At the same time, in the fall of 2017, the product Manager of "Yandex.Maps" Anton Ryazanov proposed to the management of the company to launch its own car sharing. Riazanov studied the market, worked out the business model, and presented the project to Yandex's chief operating officer Gregory Abovsky, founder and President Arkady Volozh, and CEO Alexander Shulgin. A special feature of the concept was the use of the "Yandex.Auto", which synced information about the user's frequently used addresses for Navigator and music preferences for streaming services. Official announcement of Yandex.Drive took place in mid-December 2017, and on February 21, 2018 the service began operating in Moscow with a fleet of 750 Kia Rio, Kia Rio X-Line and Renault Kaptur cars. "Drive" initially launched with a large fleet and was the first among Russian services to offer users dynamic pricing that takes into account the demand for cars and the situation on the road.

See also 
 Carsharing in Moscow

References

External links 
 Official website

Transport companies established in 2017
Carsharing
Transport companies of Russia
Yandex